Gogo Jovčev  (born 25 March 1974) is a retired Macedonian football goalkeeper, and a current coach.

Playing career

International
He made his senior debut for Macedonia in a May 1998 friendly match away against Canada and has earned a total of 9 caps, scoring no goals. His final international was a September 2005 FIFA World Cup qualification match against Finland.

Coaching career
He is currently the goalkeeper coach on the North Macedonia national football team.

References

External links
Profile at MacedonianFootball.com 

1974 births
Living people
Footballers from Skopje
Association football goalkeepers
Macedonian footballers
North Macedonia international footballers
FK Vardar players
FK Skopje players
FK Bregalnica Štip players
FK Pobeda players
FK Sloga Jugomagnat players
FK Rabotnički players
FK Belasica players
KF Shkëndija players
FK Cementarnica 55 players
FK Gorno Lisiče players
Macedonian First Football League players
Macedonian Second Football League players